Balloch Central railway station was the main railway station serving the town of Balloch in Scotland. It was opened on 15 July 1850 by the Caledonian and Dumbartonshire Junction Railway. It was renamed Balloch Central on 30 June 1952.

Operations 
For most of its passenger services, it was the terminal station. This pattern of service continued after electrification of the line in the 1960s. Between 1856 and 1934, it was served also by trains to/from Stirling over the Forth and Clyde Junction Railway. The main line from just north of Dalreoch Junction was singled in 1986 and thereafter all trains used the former southbound platform up until closure.

Closure
The station was closed on 23 April 1988 and was replaced by Balloch station, situated immediately south of the level crossing. This relocation allowed the level crossing to be closed. Today the station building has been converted into a tourist information centre. A section of platform survives behind the building.

References

Notes

Sources

External links

Disused railway stations in West Dunbartonshire
Former Dumbarton and Balloch Railway stations
Railway stations in Great Britain opened in 1850
Railway stations in Great Britain closed in 1988
Vale of Leven